The Nusu language is a Loloish language spoken by the Nu people of China and Myanmar. There are three dialects: Northern, Southern, and Central. The Central dialect of Miangu is the prestige dialect and is understood fairly well by speakers of other dialects.

Lama (2012) observes a sound change *r- > Ø- from Proto-Loloish as a Nusoish innovation.

Distribution
The three Nusu dialects are spoken in the following locations (Nusuzu Nusuyu Jianzhi 怒族怒苏语简志 1986).
Southern, also known as the Guoke-Puluo (果科-普洛) dialect: northern Lushui County 泸水县, in Guoke 果科, Puluo 普洛, Tongping 同坪, Jiajia 加甲 (3,000 speakers)
Central, also known as the Zhizhiluo-Laomudeng (知之罗-老姆登) dialect: southern Fugong County 福贡县, in Pihe 匹河怒族乡, Zhizhiluo 知之罗, Laomudeng 老姆登, Miangu 棉古, Shawa 沙瓦, Zileng 子楞 (4,000 speakers)
Northern, also known as the Wawa-Kongtong (瓦娃-空通) dialect: Fugong County 福贡县, in Wawa 瓦娃, Kongtong 空通, Youduoluo 有夺洛 (2,000 speakers)

Phonology

Consonants

Tones
Nusu has seven tones:

References

External links
Nusu language site

Loloish languages
Languages of China